Walnut Township is one of ten townships in Marshall County, Indiana, United States. As of the 2010 census, its population was 2,747 and it contained 1,124 housing units.

History
Walnut Township was organized in 1859.

The Argos Izaak Walton League Historic District was listed on the National Register of Historic Places in 2011.

Geography

Cities, towns, villages
 Argos (vast majority)

Unincorporated towns
 Walnut at

Cemeteries
The township contains these two cemeteries: Maple Grove and McGrew.

Major highways

Airports and landing strips
 Scott Airfield

Education
 Argos Community Schools

Walnut Township residents may obtain a free library card from the Argos Public Library in Argos.

Political districts
 Indiana's 2nd congressional district
 State House District 17
 State Senate District 5

References
 
 United States Census Bureau 2008 TIGER/Line Shapefiles
 IndianaMap

External links
 Indiana Township Association
 United Township Association of Indiana
 City-Data.com page for Walnut Township

Townships in Marshall County, Indiana
Townships in Indiana